Thomas F. Borgen (born 27 March 1964) is a Norwegian banker, and was CEO of Danske Bank until he resigned in September 2018 over a money-laundering scandal.

As of Q3 2022, he is in court (in Lyngby), because he has been sued for Danish kroner 2.5 billion; the litigants include current and former owners of stocks - owners such as the Oil Fund (Norway).

Early life
Thomas Borgen was born on 27 March 1964 in Sarpsborg, Norway. In 1987, he earned a BA in Business Organisation from Heriot-Watt University in Edinburgh, followed by an MBA in 1989 from Syracuse University in New York.

Career
Borgen joined Danske Bank in 1997.

In September 2013, Borgen replaced Eivind Kolding as CEO of Danske Bank.

On 19 September 2018, Borgen resigned as CEO of Danske Bank.

References

Living people
1964 births
Norwegian bankers
Norwegian chief executives
Alumni of Heriot-Watt University
Martin J. Whitman School of Management alumni
People from Sarpsborg
Danske Bank people